Akurat is a Polish band formed in November 1994 in Bielsko-Biała. 'Akurat' is an ambiguous Polish word, standing for either 'exactly, just enough' or 'yeah, sure right'. The band's style fuses punk rock, reggae, ska and pop.

Discography

Studio albums

Music videos

References

External links
 Official website

Polish rock music groups
Musical groups established in 1994
Musical quintets
1994 establishments in Poland
Mystic Production artists